Proxiuber is a genus of sea snails, marine gastropod molluscs in the family Naticidae, the moon shells.

Species
Species within the genus Proxiuber include:
 Proxiuber australis (Hutton, 1878)
 Proxiuber hulmei Powell, 1954

References 

 Powell A. W. B. (1979), New Zealand Mollusca, William Collins Publishers Ltd, Auckland, New Zealand 

Naticidae
Gastropods of New Zealand
Extant Paleocene first appearances